Stub or Stubb may refer to:

Shortened objects and entities
 Stub (stock), the portion of a corporation left over after most but not all of it has been bought out or spun out
 Stub, a tree cut and allowed to regrow from the trunk; see Pollarding
 Pay stub, a receipt or record that the employer has paid an employee
 Stub period, period of time over which interest accrues which is not equal to the usual interval between bond coupon
 Stub road, an unused road junction
 Ticket stub, the portion of an admissions ticket that is retained by the ticket holder

Computing and electronics
 Stub (distributed computing), a piece of work of a greater calculation in distributed computing
 Stub (electronics), a calculated length section of transmission line used to match impedance in transmission lines
 Method stub, in computer programming, a piece of code used to stand in for some other programming functionality
 Stub network, in computer networking, a section of network with only one exit router to other networks
 Test stub, one type of test doubles (along with mock objects) in software testing

People

Given name or nickname
 Stub Brown (1870–1938), American baseball player
 Stubb Ross (died 1987), Canadian airline executive
 Christopher B. "Stubb" Stubblefield, (1931–1995), barbecue restaurateur and chef, and musician
 Stub Wiberg (1875–1929), Norwegian actor

Surname
 Alexander Stubb (born 1968), Finnish politician
 Ambrosius Stub (1705–1758), Danish poet
 Hans Stubb (1906–1973), German soccer player
 Jens Stub (1764–1819), Norwegian politician
 Sverre Stub (born 1946), Norwegian diplomat

Other uses
 Stub Place, settlement in Cumbria, England
 Stubb, a character in the novel Moby-Dick by Herman Melville

See also
 Stubbe, a surname
 Stubble (disambiguation)
 Stubbs (disambiguation)

Lists of people by nickname